Korea Bio Polytechnic College is a two-year institute of higher learning in Nonsan 320-905, Republic of Korea.  It has five departments with a total of one hundred fifty students.

The departments include:
 Department of Bioelectronics and Bioinformatics
 Department of Laboratory Animal Medicine
 Department of Bio Quality Control
 Department of Bio-Food Technology

References

External links 
  

Bio
Nonsan